Odoniella is a genus of African bugs in the family Miridae and tribe Dicyphini.

Odoniella is typical of the subtribe (or genus complex) Odoniellina: which includes the economically important, cocoa pest genera Distantiella and Sahlbergella, with this genus and Bryocoropsis also implicated.

Species
The Global Biodiversity Information Facility lists:
 Odoniella apicalis Reuter & Poppius, 1911
 Odoniella camerunensis Schumacher, 1917
 Odoniella immaculipennis Poppius, 1914
 Odoniella reuteri Haglund, 1895 - type species
 Odoniella rubra Reuter, 1905
 Odoniella similis Poppius, 1914
 Odoniella unicolor Poppius, 1912

References

External links
 

Miridae genera
Hemiptera of Africa